The Comarca de Antequera is a comarca (currently with no administrative role) in Andalusia, southern Spain.

It is located in the area of the Surco Intrabético range, on the boundary with the province of Córdoba. The landscape is largely plain (Hoya de Antequera), run by the higher valley of the Guadalhorce river.

The present-day comarca was established in 2003 by the Government of Andalusia.

Municipalities
The comarca originally included seven municipalities, a further municipality, Villanueva de la Concepción, was created by separation from Antequera municipality on 17 March 2009: 

+ a new municipality, created in 2009 from part of Antequera municipality.

References

External links

Comarcas of Andalusia
Geography of the Province of Málaga